Duraku is a surname. Notable people with the surname include:

 Emin Duraku (1918–1942), Yugoslav partisan active during World War II
 Esat Duraku (born 1936), Albanian chess master
 Izet Duraku, director of the National Centre of Cultural Property Inventory (NCCPI) in Albania

See also
Duraković

Albanian-language surnames